Tukang Besi is an Austronesian language spoken in the Tukangbesi Islands in southeast Sulawesi in Indonesia by a quarter million speakers. A Tukang Besi pidgin is used in the area.

Phonology

The northern dialect of Tukang Besi has 25 consonant phonemes and a basic 5-vowel system. It features stress which is usually on the second-to-last syllable. The language has two implosive consonants, which are uncommon in the world's languages. The coronal plosives and  have prenasalized counterparts which act as separate phonemes.

Notes:
  only appears in loanwords, but it contrasts with 

Orthography

Vowels
 a – 
 e – 
 i – 
 o – 
 u –

Consonants
 b – 
 b̠ – 
 c – 
 d – 
 d̠ – 
 g – 
 h – 
 j – 
 k – 
 l – 
 m – 
 mb – 
 mp – 
 n – 
 nd – 
 ns – 
 nt – 
 ng – 
 ngg – 
 ngk – 
 nj – 
 p – 
 r – 
 s – 
 t – 
 w – 
 ' –

Grammar

Nouns
Tukang Besi does not have grammatical gender or number. It is an ergative–absolutive language.

Verbs
Tukang Besi has an inflectional future tense, which is indicated with a prefix, but no past tense.

Word order
Tukang Besi uses verb–object–subject word order, which is also used by Fijian. Like many Austronesian languages, it has prepositions, but places adjectives, genitives, and determiners after nouns. Yes-no questions are indicated by a particle at the end of the sentence.

References

Further reading
 
 
 

Muna–Buton languages
Languages of Sulawesi
Southeast Sulawesi